Robert Góralczyk (March 21, 1943 – May 18, 1984) was a Polish ice hockey player. He played for the Poland men's national ice hockey team at the 1972 Winter Olympics in Sapporo, and the 1976 Winter Olympics in Innsbruck. His brother, Feliks also played at the 1972 Winter Olympics.

References

1943 births
1984 deaths
Baildon Katowice players
Ice hockey players at the 1972 Winter Olympics
Ice hockey players at the 1976 Winter Olympics
Olympic ice hockey players of Poland
People from Mikołów County
Polish ice hockey defencemen